Murray County Courthouse in Chatsworth, Georgia was built in 1916.  It was listed on the National Register of Historic Places in 1980.
It has an elevated position and can be viewed from afar.

A 1980 architectural survey identified it as one of only two Palladian architecture applications among Georgia courthouses.  The other is the Old Effingham County Courthouse in Springfield, Georgia.

The survey asserted it "is the most important architectural structure in Chatsworth."

References

Courthouses on the National Register of Historic Places in Georgia (U.S. state)
Neoclassical architecture in Georgia (U.S. state)
Government buildings completed in 1916
Buildings and structures in Murray County, Georgia
County courthouses in Georgia (U.S. state)
National Register of Historic Places in Murray County, Georgia